Statistics of Danish War Tournament in the 1940/1941 season.

Series 1

Series 2

Series 3

Quarterfinals
Boldklubben 1913 3-4 Fremad Amager
Boldklubben af 1893 0-4 KFUM
Aalborg Boldspilklub 2-5 Boldklubben Frem
Boldklubben 1903 3-3 Østerbros Boldklub
Boldklubben 1903 was awarded winner by lot.

Semifinals
Boldklubben 1903 1-2 Fremad Amager
KFUM 1-2 Boldklubben Frem

Final
Fremad Amager 2-4 Boldklubben Frem

References
Denmark - List of final tables (RSSSF)

Top level Danish football league seasons
Den
Football